Timmy Gillion (born 16 March 2002) is a French track cyclist, who competes in sprint events. He won a silver medal in the Team sprint at the 2021 UEC European Track Championships.

References

External links
 

2002 births
Living people
French male cyclists
French track cyclists
Sportspeople from Perpignan
Cyclists from Occitania (administrative region)